DJ Sem is an Algerian DJ, songwriter and producer based in Paris and specializing in world beats including R&B, hip hop, raï, house, reggaeton, funk. He has collaborated with a great number of artists based in France particularly from ethnic backgrounds, notably Cheba Zahouania, Tunisiano, Reda Taliani, Mokobé, Lacrim, Lartiste, Mister You, Sultan, Matt Houston, Marwa Loud etc. He is signed with Universal Music France.

Discography

Albums

Singles

*Did not appear in the official Belgian Ultratop 50 charts, but rather in the bubbling under Ultratip charts.

References

External links
Facebook

French DJs
French record producers
Living people
Year of birth missing (living people)